Digiboo LLC, founded in 2009, is a location-based retail download service providing movie and TV show downloads to mobile devices.  Kiosks with thousands of movie and TV show titles available on demand, allow the downloading of media direct to phones, laptops and USB 3.0 storage devices, at speeds of 1–3 minutes per full-length movie.

References

Video on demand services
Online companies of the United States